Bill Post is an American politician, radio personality, and former Oregon State Legislator who is a member of the Republican Party. In 2014, he was elected to represent Oregon's House District 25 in the Oregon House of Representatives. He was a conservative talk radio host until March 2014, when he suspended his show after garnering a Republican primary opponent, Barbara Jensen of Keizer. He stated at the time that he would remain program director and operations manager at the radio station.

Post defeated Jensen in the May 20, 2014, primary and went on to face Independent Party nominee Chuck Lee in the general election, whom he also defeated.

In 2014, Post made the assertion that then Speaker Tina Kotek had, “never held a job or run a business”. The nonpartisan  group PolitiFact judged that statement as untrue and rated it Pant’s on Fire on their truth scale. Post admitted to PolitiFact that he was untruthful and made the claim up stating, “I don’t know her history. I just pulled that out of my hat.” 

Post had no primary election challenger in May 2016 and went on to defeat Democratic challenger Sharon Freeman in November 2016.

In 2017, while a sitting State Representative, Post returned to the airwaves on another local AM station, 1220 KPJC, first in the mornings, then moving his show to the 3–6pm time slot.

In 2017, Post was accused of making advances on a female staffer including sending inappropriate text messages about his wife not being home. While Post denied these allegations, An investigation found "that [Post] had engaged in inappropriate and unwelcome conduct, including physical contact, with a Legislative staffer". Post was chastised by his Republican colleagues for his actions.

Post formerly held the seat for Oregon's 25th House district, which includes Keizer, St. Paul, and Newberg.

On December 11, 2020, Post and 11 other state Republican officials signed a letter requesting Oregon Attorney General Ellen Rosenblum join Texas and other states contesting the results of the 2020 presidential election in Texas v. Pennsylvania. Rosenblum announced she had filed in behalf of the defense, and against Texas, the day prior.

In September 2021, Post announced he would not be seeking reelection. In October 2021, Post announced that he and his wife had sold their home in Keizer and relocated to Fallon, Nevada, casting doubt on his eligibility to complete his House term scheduled to expire in January 2023. Later that month he officially resigned from his House seat effective November 30, 2021, allowing his eventual successor the opportunity to serve in the 81st Oregon Legislative Assembly. Jessica George, a former legislative aide, was selected on December 10, 2021, to finish Post's term.

In the 2022 General Election, Bill Post ran for the position of School Trustee for the Churchill County School Board in Nevada. Post placed 6th out of 7 candidates, coming in second to last, failing to secure a seat as only the top 4 are elected to the board.

On December 22, 2022, Post teased that his Radio show would be back on the Air in Nevada.

Personal life
Post was born at Luke Air Force Base in Glendale, Arizona. He moved to Oregon at an early age and grew up in Albany, Redmond, and Salem. He attended George Fox University and Southern Oregon State College, where he earned a bachelor's degree. He has been involved in radio, first as a deejay and later as a conservative talk radio personality, since 1979. He hosted the Bill Post Radio Show on KYKN from 2009 to 2014.

References

External links
 Legislative website
 Campaign website
Please note, both of these websites are now inactive. Best way to view them is through the Wayback Machine.

Living people
Republican Party members of the Oregon House of Representatives
People from Keizer, Oregon
Southern Oregon University alumni
American radio personalities
George Fox University alumni
Year of birth missing (living people)
21st-century American politicians